Tegosa is a Neotropical genus of butterflies from Mexico to South America in the family Nymphalidae.

Species
Listed alphabetically:
Tegosa anieta (Hewitson, 1864) – black-bordered tegosa
Tegosa claudina (Eschscholtz, 1821) – Claudina's tegosa, apricot crescent
Tegosa etia (Hewitson, 1868) – rusty crescent
Tegosa flavida (Hewitson, 1868)
Tegosa fragilis (Bates, 1864)
Tegosa guatemalena (Bates, 1864) – Guatemalan tegosa
Tegosa infrequens Higgins, 1981
Tegosa nazaria (C. & R. Felder, [1867])
Tegosa nigrella (Bates, 1866) – dark tegosa
Tegosa orobia (Hewitson, 1864)
Tegosa pastazena (Bates, 1864) – Pastazena crescent
Tegosa selene (Röber, 1913) – Selene crescent
Tegosa serpia Higgins, 1981 – serpia crescent
Tegosa tissoides (Hall, 1928) – tissoides crescent

References

Melitaeini
Nymphalidae of South America
Butterfly genera
Taxa named by Robert P. Higgins